Mariana Stoyanova (born 3 July 1967) is a Bulgarian rower. She competed at the 1988 Summer Olympics and the 1992 Summer Olympics.

References

External links
 

1967 births
Living people
Bulgarian female rowers
Olympic rowers of Bulgaria
Rowers at the 1988 Summer Olympics
Rowers at the 1992 Summer Olympics
People from Sandanski
Sportspeople from Blagoevgrad Province